Profile is an album by Dutch jazz guitarist  Jan Akkerman.

Track listing
 "Fresh Air" (Akkerman) – 19:55
(a) Must Be My Land
(b) Wrestling to Get Out
(c) Back Again
(d) This Fight
(e) Fresh Air – Blue Notes for Listening
(f) Water and Skies Are Telling Me
(g) Happy Gabriel?
 "Kemp's Jig" (anonymous) – 1:34
 "Etude" (Matteo Carcassi) – 1:33
 "Blue Boy" (Akkerman) – 2:26
 "Andante Sostenuto" (Anton Diabelli) – 4:09
 "Maybe Just a Dream" (Akkerman) – 2:35
 "Minstrel/Farmers Dance" (Akkerman) – 1:46
 "Stick" (Akkerman) – 3:41

Personnel
 Jan Akkerman – guitar, bass
 Ferry Maat – piano (track 8)
 Bert Ruiter – bass guitar 
 Jaap van Eik – bass guitar (track 8)
 Pierre van der Linden – drums
 Frans Smit – drums (track 8)

References

External links
 Jan Akkerman's official website

1972 albums
Jan Akkerman albums
Instrumental albums